The Woman Who Left is a 2016 Philippine drama film written, produced, edited, and directed by Lav Diaz. Filmed entirely in black-and-white, it was selected to compete in the main competition section at the 73rd Venice International Film Festival where it won the Golden Lion. Although it has received a very limited release, the film has received nearly universal acclaim from critics.

The Woman Who Left was the first film made by Charo Santos-Concio when she returned to acting after stepping down as president and CEO of ABS-CBN Corporation.

Plot
Horacia Somorostro (Charo Santos-Concio) was released in 1997 after being imprisoned for a crime she did not commit. Although Somorostro reunites with her daughter, she learns that her husband is now deceased and her son is missing. She realized that a thing remains unchanged - the power and privilege of the elite. This belief is cemented when Somorostro later found out that her former rich lover, Rodrigo Trinidad (Michael de Mesa) was the one who framed her for a crime. She learns that Trinidad is forced to stay within his house like his friends due to kidnapping incidents targeting the rich. To the ruling class, the kidnappings are the most serious problem in the country's history. Somorostro begins to plot her revenge amidst the crisis.

Cast

Charo Santos-Concio as Horacia Somorostro / Renata
John Lloyd Cruz as Hollanda
Nonie Buencamino as Magbabalot
Shamaine Buencamino as Petra
Michael de Mesa as Rodrigo Trinidad
Kakai Bautista as Dading
Marjorie Lorico as Minerva
Mayen Estanero as Nena 
Lao Rodriguez as Father
Jean Judith Javier as Mameng
Mae Paner as Warden
Jo-Ann Requiestas as Taba
Daniel Palisa as Harry
Romelyn Sale

Production
The Woman Who Left was directed by Lav Diaz, who was also the film's editor and cinematographer. It was produced by Sine Olivia and Cinema One Originals with the latter's head Ronald Arguelles being the film's executive producer. According to Diaz the film was made not for a film festival. The film was planned to have a duration of four hours and by June 2016, the film was already in the editing process.

The film was primarily shot in Calapan, Oriental Mindoro, the Philippines which is the hometown of lead actress, Charo Santos-Concio. According to Diaz, the film was inspired by the 1872 short story "God Sees the Truth, But Waits" by Leo Tolstoy. Diaz, reflecting on the story and how it relates to his work, said that life is not truly understood by anyone and that more often people "abide and succumb to life's randomness." Charo Santos-Concio, the lead actress described the film as "a story of forgiveness, of transcendence."

Release
While the film was not made for a particular film festival, director Diaz is open to the idea of screening The Woman Who Left in film festivals. In June 2016, it was reported that talks were ongoing for the film to be screened locally in the Philippines and overseas. There were also talks for the film to be screened at the 2016 Metro Manila Film Festival.

The Woman Who Left was screened at the 73rd Venice International Film Festival held in September 2016 as the lone entry produced entirely by an Asian production film company. The 2016 Venice Film Festival marks the third time director Lav Diaz has entered a work at the film festival.

The Woman Who Left will also be screened at the 2016 Cinema One Originals Film Festival. The film's local commercial theatrical release was initially set on 23 September 2016 to run for at least a week so it could be eligible to be submitted as a Philippine entry for the Best Foreign Language Film award at the 89th Academy Awards. The playdate of The Woman Who Left was moved to 28 September 2016 after Ma' Rosa was selected as the Philippine submission for the award instead.

Critical reception
On the review aggregator website Rotten Tomatoes, The Woman Who Left holds an approval rating of 80% based on 20 reviews, and an average rating of 7.3/10. On Metacritic, the film has a weighted average score of 83 out of 100, based on 13 critics, indicating "universal acclaim".

Accolades

References

External links
 

2016 films
2016 drama films
Philippine drama films
Philippine black-and-white films
Films directed by Lav Diaz
Films set in 1997
Golden Lion winners
Films based on works by Leo Tolstoy
Films based on short fiction